Pristimantis modipeplus is a species of frog in the family Strabomantidae. It is endemic to the Andes of central Ecuador in Chimborazo, Pichincha, and Tungurahua Provinces. Common name Urbina robber frog has been proposed for it.

Description
Adult males measure  and adult females  in snout–vent length. The head is narrower than the body and slightly wider than it is long. The snout is subacuminate in dorsal view and bluntly rounded in lateral profile. The tympanum is prominent but its upper edge is concealed by the thick supratympanic fold. The finger and toe tips bear discs. Coloration is dorsally brown to reddish-brown with creamy-tan interorbital bar and sacral spot, both edged with black. The groin, axilla, and concealed parts of the thigh and shank are reddish orange to blood red. Males have pale yellow throat. The venter is dirty cream, possibly with or gray and brown marbling. The iris is gray with brown marbling and a medium reddish brown horizontal streak. Males have a subgular vocal sac.

Habitat and conservation
Specimens have been found beneath a large flat rock beside a stream and beneath clumps of dirt in a dried-up vernal pond. Development presumably is direct (i.e., there is no free-living larval stage).

Pristimantis modipeplus is an uncommon species that is threatened by habitat loss and degradation associated with, e.g., agriculture, livestock farming, and pine plantations. It is not known to occur in protected areas.

References

modipeplus
Amphibians of Ecuador
Amphibians of the Andes
Endemic fauna of Ecuador
Amphibians described in 1981
Taxa named by John Douglas Lynch
Taxonomy articles created by Polbot